Love Carol is the second and final studio album released by American singer Carol Lloyd, released in 1983 by Philly World Records.

Background and development 
Several decades later, the Essential Media Group record label reissued Love Carol in a digital format on June 24, 2014. It was distributed to the iTunes Store in the United States and features "remastered" versions of all seven songs that appear on the album. It also featured the radio edit version of "Come See About Me", which had previously been unreleased. The same label reissued "Come See About Me" with B-side "I Just Want to Love You" on May 13, 2014.

Promotion 
Carol Lloyd released a cover of the Supremes "Come See About Me" as the album's lead and only single in late 1982. It was distributed in the 7" and 12" vinyl formats and featured album track "I Just Want to Love You" as its B-side track. "Score", Lloyd's debut single which was previously used as the lead single on Score, is also included on Love Carol as the album's closing track.

Track listing

Personnel 
Credits adapted from the liner notes of the vinyl edition of Love Carol.

 Carol Lloyd vocals, backing vocals
 Al Alberts, Jr. engineering
 Michael Booghi assistant engineering
 Robert Borland assistant engineering
 T.G. Conway production 
 Duke Forrester assistant engineering
 Michael Forte production 
 Jason Robert Lyle engineering
 Carolyn Mitchell backing vocals

 Cheryl Solem backing vocals
 The Ultimate Players music
 Vaneese Thomas backing vocals
 Buddy Turner production , backing vocals
 Bruce Weeden production , engineering
 David Williams production 
 Denise Williams production 
 Jerry Williamson engineering

References

External links 
 

1983 albums